Nedim Yücel is a Turkish professional basketball player. He currently plays for Darüşşafaka & Doğuş.

He studied at Anadolu University.

References

External links
 TBLStat.net Profile

1979 births
Living people
Antalya Büyükşehir Belediyesi players
Beşiktaş men's basketball players
Karşıyaka basketball players
Mersin Büyükşehir Belediyesi S.K. players
Power forwards (basketball)
Basketball players from Istanbul
TED Ankara Kolejliler players
Türk Telekom B.K. players
Turkish men's basketball players
Anadolu University alumni
Darüşşafaka Basketbol players